Superman: Last Son of Earth is a 2000 American comic book miniseries, published by DC Comics under its Elseworlds imprint. Written by Steve Gerber with art by Doug Wheatley, the two-issue storyline focuses on social commentary: particularly xenophobia, cultural stagnation, and authoritarianism. The story is a reverse of the usual Superman origin, with Kal-El being sent from Earth to Krypton and discovering a Green Lantern power ring. With the powers of a Green Lantern, Krypton's adopted son journeys to Earth, the planet of his birth, discover the remnants of a civilization struggling to survive amid both ecological adversities and a ruthless would-be dictator named Luthor. A sequel, Superman: Last Stand on Krypton was released in 2003.

Characters
The characters appeared in the story are from both elements and cast of the Superman and Green Lantern mythology:

 Kal-El
 Lantern of Krypton 
 Jonathan Kent 
 Jor-El
 Lara
 Lois Lane
 Perry White
 Seyg-El
 Kelex
 Green Lantern Corps
 Guardians of the Universe
 Jimmy Olsen
 Martha Kent 
 Lex Luthor

Plot
Jonathan Kent is a scientific genius who discovers that a meteor is about to crash into Earth. He then builds a rocket to carry his wife and son into space, but his wife would rather stay by his side, and so their son is sent alone. The ship eventually lands on Krypton and the boy, Clark Kent, is adopted by Jor-El and renamed Kal-El. Kal eventually finds a Green Lantern ring and saves Krypton. He later uses the ring to recover his memories and he returns to Earth, where he meets his love, Lois Lane, and his greatest enemy, Lex Luthor. Due to Kal-El's body having adapted to the stronger gravity of Krypton, he is a physical powerhouse when he returns to Earth (with superhuman strength, speed, agility, endurance, and resistance to injury, much like the classic Superman in his earliest appearances), which he discovers when Luthor steals his ring in an attempt to access its power.

Sequel
The sequel Superman: Last Stand on Krypton was released in 2003, also written by Steve Gerber and art by Doug Wheatley. The story picks up 10 years after Superman: Last Son of Earth.

In other comics
The premise of Superman becoming a Green Lantern on Krypton was visited in mainstream continuity. In JLA #8-9, the supervillain known as the Key traps the Justice League in their own private dreamworlds using a neural virus. In Superman's mind, he was born and raised on a Krypton that had not exploded. One day he discovered the dying Green Lantern Tomar-Re crashed on Krypton. Tomar gave Superman his power ring and named him the Green Lantern of Sector 2813. In this fake reality Superman was able to use his ring to trap criminals in the Phantom Zone.

Publication
 Superman: Last Son of Earth #1-2 (52 page, July-August 2000)

See also
 List of Elseworlds publications
 Batman: In Darkest Knight

References

 Superman: Last Son of Earth Grand Comics Database
 Superman: Last Son of Earth Comic Book DB

External links
 Superman: Last Son of Earth at Rambles
 Superman: Last Son of Earth at Comicvine
 Superman: Last Son of Earth at DC Wikia

Last Son of Earth
Elseworlds titles
Impact events in fiction
Comics by Steve Gerber
Green Lantern titles
2000 comics debuts
Crossover comics